Andrew J. Petter  (born 1953) is the chair of Innovate BC, a provincial Crown agency responsible for supporting innovation and growth in the technology sector in British Columbia.

Andrew Petter served as President and Vice-Chancellor of Simon Fraser University in British Columbia, Canada. He is also a former provincial politician. He was the Dean of the University of Victoria law school and served briefly as Attorney General of British Columbia under the New Democratic Party government of Ujjal Dosanjh. Petter has written extensively about the role of the Canadian Charter of Rights and Freedoms and its effect on government powers and decision making.

In 2018, he was appointed to the Order of Canada in recognition of his commitment and leadership in advancing university-community engagement and higher education throughout the country. In 2018, he also earned the Peter Lougheed Award for Leadership in Public Policy from the Public Policy Forum. In 2020, he received an honorary degree from Kwantlen Polytechnic University for his leadership, collaborative program development and advocacy for post-secondary education in the region. In 2021, he was admitted to the Order of British Columbia for his transformative impact on public policy, legal engagement and community betterment.

Education
Petter pursued undergraduate studies at now defunct Notre Dame University College in Nelson, BC and at the University of Victoria before receiving an LL.B. from the University of Victoria in 1981. Upon graduation he won the Law Society of British Columbia gold medal for the highest standing in his class. He subsequently received an LL.M. from Cambridge University in 1982 where he studied on a Commonwealth Scholarship and graduated with first class honours.

Career
Petter was a legal adviser to the Constitutional Branch of the Saskatchewan Department of Justice. Petter then taught at Osgoode Hall Law School between 1984 and 1986. He then joined the University of Victoria Faculty of Law in 1986.

Politics
Petter was twice elected to the Legislative Assembly of British Columbia in the general provincial elections of 1991 and 1996; from 1991 until 2001 Petter represented the riding of Saanich South. His constituency work included establishing the Galloping Goose Regional Trail for cyclists.

During his time in the Legislative Assembly, he held several cabinet portfolios including that of Attorney General of British Columbia from February to November 2000. He served as Minister of Advanced Education, Training and Technology and Minister of Intergovernmental Relations from February 1998 to February 2000, and was Minister Responsible for Youth for part of that time. Petter also served as Minister of Finance and Corporate Relations and Minister Responsible for Intergovernmental Relations from June 1996 to February 1998, Minister of Health from February to June 1996, Minister of Forests from September 1993 to February 1996 and Minister of Aboriginal Affairs from November 1991 to September 1993. As Minister of Forests from September 1993 to February 1996, Petter oversaw the establishment of the B.C. Forest Practices Code. He also was on the First Nations Task Force along with Brian Mulroney, Tom Sidden, and Mike Harcourt that created and put into effect- The Treaty Commission Act in British Columbia in May 1993.

Higher education
Subsequent to his career in politics, he served as dean of the University of Victoria's faculty of law from 2001 until 2008 (the first year as Acting Dean). During his time as Dean, the UVic Faculty established a new graduate law program, created a national aboriginal economic development chair and supported the first cohort of the Akitsiraq Law School in Nunavut.

Innovate BC
On March 19, 2021, Petter was appointed chair of Innovate BC’s board of directors. He took over the position from Alan Shaver. The appointment was announced by Ravi Kahlon, Minister of Jobs, Economic Recovery and Innovation.

Selected publications
 "Private Rights/Public Wrongs: The Liberal Lie of the Charter" in the University of Toronto Law Journal, 1995
 "The Politics of the Charter", Supreme Court Law Review, 1986
 "Rights in Conflict: The Dilemma of Charter Legitimacy", University of British Columbia Law Review, 1989
 "Federalism and the Myth of the Federal Spending Power", Canadian Bar Review, 1989

Electoral results

References

1953 births
Alumni of the University of Cambridge
British Columbia New Democratic Party MLAs
Canadian legal scholars
Canadian King's Counsel
Canadian university and college chief executives
Canadian university and college faculty deans
Deans of law schools in Canada
Living people
Members of the Executive Council of British Columbia
Members of the Order of Canada
Members of the Order of British Columbia
Politicians from Victoria, British Columbia
Simon Fraser University
University of Victoria alumni
Attorneys General of British Columbia
Finance ministers of British Columbia
Health ministers of British Columbia